Tom Township is a township in Benton County, in the U.S. state of Missouri.

Tom Township was formed on April 2, 1842, taking its name from Tom Bishop, who was court clerk, when the township was organized.

References

Townships in Missouri
Townships in Benton County, Missouri